Volumen ProIIIbido also known as Volumen Prohibido is the third studio album from Mexican hip hop group Cartel de Santa. It was released on March 20, 2006 by Sony BMG and Babilonia Music. The album has featured guests such as Sinful El Pecador, Mr. Pomel and Mery Dee.

Track listing 
 Mira Quien Vuelva Al 100
 Cheka Wey (ft. Mery Dee)
 La Ranfla del Cartel
 Déjate Caer (ft. Mr. Pomel)
 Hey Si Me Ven
 México Lindo y Bandido
 2 Mujeres En Mi Cama
 Si Son Bien Jotos (ft. Mr. Pomel)
 Yo Me La Perez Prado
 Conexión Vieja Escuela (ft. Sinful El Pecador)
 Subele a La Greibol
 Ahora Si Voy A Lokear

References

2006 albums
Cartel de Santa albums